Jiří Černý is a retired Czechoslovak slalom canoeist who competed in the 1960s. He won three medals at the ICF Canoe Slalom World Championships with a silver (Folding K-1 team: 1961) and two bronzes (Folding K-1: 1961, 1963).

References

Czechoslovak male canoeists
Czech male canoeists
Living people
Year of birth missing (living people)
Medalists at the ICF Canoe Slalom World Championships